Fei Xu (born 1969) is an American developmental psychologist and cognitive scientist who is currently a professor of psychology and the director of the Berkeley Early Learning Lab at UC Berkeley. Her research focuses on cognitive and language development, from infancy to middle childhood.

Early life
Xu was born and raised in Beijing, China, where she graduated from the High School Affiliated to Renmin University of China. She moved to the U.S. and attended Smith College, graduating in 1991 with a B.A. in Cognitive Science. She earned her Ph.D. in Cognitive Science from M.I.T. in 1995.

Career
Xu began her career as a postdoctoral fellow at the University of Pennsylvania, Rutgers University, and M.I.T. under Alan M. Leslie. She joined Northeastern University as an assistant professor in 1997. She was a visiting professor at UC Berkeley in 2007–2008, then returned to UBC. In 2009, she joined the UC Berkeley Department of Psychology as a Professor, where she is also the director of the school's Early Learning Lab.

Research
Xu worked with several prominent developmental and cognitive psychologists early in her career.  She worked with Susan Carey for her Ph.D. research on object individuation, sortal concepts, and early word learning. She worked with Elizabeth Spelke as a postdoctoral fellow, focusing on prelinguistic infants’ representation of numbers.  She also worked with Alan Leslie at Rutgers University on infants’ object concept.

Beginning in the 2010s, Xu advocated for a new approach to the study of cognitive development, namely rational constructivism. She argued that human infants begin life with a set of proto-conceptual primitives such as object, number, and agent, and as young learners acquire language. These initial representations are transformed into a format that is compatible with language and propositional thought. She suggested that three types of learning mechanisms explain both belief revision and genuine conceptual change: (1) Language and symbol learning; (2) Bayesian inductive learning; and (3) Constructive thinking.  She also suggests that infants and young children are active learners, and cognitive agency is part and parcel of development. In addition, she has explored the implications of rational constructivism for philosophy of mind and epistemology.

Awards
 2006: Stanton Prize from the Society for Philosophy and Psychology.
 2018: Guggenheim Fellowship
She is a fellow of the Association for Psychological Science and is a member of the editorial board for Psychological Science.
2020: Fellow of the Society of Experimental Psychologists.

Selected bibliography
 Xu, F. (1995) Criteria of Object Individual and Numerical Identity in Infants and Adults: The Object-first Hypothesis. M.I.T.
 Leslie, A., Xu, F., Tremoulet, P, & Scholl, B. (1998)"Indexing and the object concept: developing 'what' and 'where' systems". Trends in Cognitive Sciences.
 Xu, F. & Spelke, S. (2000) "Large number discrimination in 6-month-old infants". Cognition.
Xu, F., & Tenenbaum, J. B. (2007). Word learning as Bayesian inference. Psychological Review, 114(2), 245–272. https://doi.org/10.1037/0033-295X.114.2.245
Xu, F. & Garcia, V. (2008).  Intuitive statistics by 8-month-old infants. Proceedings of the National Academy of Sciences 105 (13), 5012-5015    https://doi.org/10.1073/pnas.0704450105
 Xu, F. & Kushnir, T., eds. (2012) Rational Constructivism in Cognitive Development. Advances in Child Development and Behavior, Vol. 43. Academic Press.
 Xu, F. & Kushnir, T. (2013) "Infants are rational constructive learners". Current Directions in Psychological Science.
 Xu. F. (2016) "Preliminary thoughts on a rational constructivist approach to cognitive development: primitives, symbols, learning, and thinking". In Core knowledge and concept change. Oxford University Press.
 Fedyk, M. & Xu, F. (2018) "The epistemology of rational constructivism". Review of Philosophy and Psychology.
 Xu, F. (2019) "Towards a rational constructivist theory of cognitive development". Psychological Review.
 Denison, S. & Xu, F. (2019) "Infant statisticians: the origins of reasoning under uncertainty". Perspectives on Psychological Science.

References

External links
 Berkeley Early Learning Lab
 
 Fei Xu as indexed by Neurotree

Canada Research Chairs
20th-century American psychologists
21st-century American psychologists
Asian-American women psychologists
Cognitive development researchers
University of California, Berkeley College of Letters and Science faculty
Massachusetts Institute of Technology School of Science alumni
Smith College alumni
People from Beijing
High School Affiliated to Renmin University of China alumni
1969 births
Living people
21st-century American women